The Country Music Association Awards is a major awards show in country music, with the highest honor being the award for Entertainer of the Year.  It is the final award presented at the ceremony. Garth Brooks has won the most awards with seven. In 1972, Loretta Lynn became the first female artist to be honored with this award. Barbara Mandrell became the first artist to win twice (1980, 1981). Taylor Swift is the only woman to win this award in the 2000s and 2010s.

Recipients

In the following tables, the years correspond to the date of the ceremony. Artists are eligible based on their work of the previous calendar year. Entries with a blue ribbon next to the artist's name have won the award; those with a white background are the nominees on the short-list.

Category Facts

Most Wins

Most Nominations 

Won on First nomination

 Eddy Arnold (1967)
 Roy Clark (1973)
 Charlie Rich (1974)
 John Denver (1975)
 Mel Tillis (1976)
 Hank Williams Jr. (1987)
 Garth Brooks (1991)
 Shania Twain (1999)
 Keith Urban (2005) 
 Taylor Swift (2009)

See also
Academy of Country Music Award for Entertainer of the Year

References

Country Music Association Awards